Partula producta was a species of air-breathing tropical land snail, a terrestrial pulmonate gastropod mollusk in the family Partulidae. This species was endemic to Tahiti, French Polynesia. It is now extinct.

References

Partula (gastropod)
Extinct gastropods
Taxa named by William Harper Pease
Taxonomy articles created by Polbot
Gastropods described in 1864